Syagrus cinerascens is a species of leaf beetle from Senegal, described by Léon Fairmaire in 1894.

References

Eumolpinae
Insects of West Africa
Beetles of Africa
Beetles described in 1894
Taxa named by Léon Fairmaire